The Timor warty pig (Sus celebensis timoriensis) is a subspecies of Sus celebensis, or Celebes warty pig.  Though described as a separate species, it is a feral form of the Celebes warty pig found in the Lesser Sunda Islands.

Sources
 Ultimate Ungulate

Suidae
Mammals of Timor